This article lists all described species of the spider family Pisauridae accepted by the World Spider Catalog :

A

Afropisaura

Afropisaura Blandin, 1976
 A. ducis (Strand, 1913) — West, Central, East Africa
 A. rothiformis (Strand, 1908) — West, Central, East Africa
 A. valida (Simon, 1886) (type) — West, Central Africa

Archipirata

Archipirata Simon, 1898
 A. tataricus Simon, 1898 (type) — Turkmenistan, China

Architis

Architis Simon, 1898
 A. altamira Santos, 2007 — Brazil
 A. amazonica (Simon, 1898) — Brazil
 A. brasiliensis (Mello-Leitão, 1940) — Brazil
 A. capricorna Carico, 1981 — Brazil, Argentina
 A. catuaba Santos, 2008 — Brazil, Peru
 A. colombo Santos, 2007 — Brazil
 A. comaina Santos, 2007 — Peru
 A. cymatilis Carico, 1981 — Trinidad, Colombia to Brazil
 A. dianasilvae Santos, 2007 — Peru
 A. erwini Santos, 2007 — Ecuador
 A. fritzmuelleri Santos, 2007 — Brazil
 A. gracilis Santos, 2008 — Brazil
 A. helveola (Simon, 1898) — Colombia, Ecuador, Brazil
 A. ikuruwa Carico, 1981 — Guyana, Suriname, Peru, Bolivia
 A. maturaca Santos, 2007 — Brazil
 A. neblina Santos & Nogueira, 2008 — Brazil
 A. robusta Carico, 1981 — Panama, Brazil
 A. spinipes (Taczanowski, 1874) — Panama, Trinidad to Argentina
 A. tenuipes (Simon, 1898) — Brazil
 A. tenuis Simon, 1898 (type) — Panama to Brazil
 A. turvo Santos, 2007 — Brazil

B

Blandinia

Blandinia Tonini, Paulo da Silva, Serpa Filho & Freitas, 2016
 B. mahasoana (Blandin, 1979) (type) — Madagascar

Bradystichus

Bradystichus Simon, 1884
 B. aoupinie Platnick & Forster, 1993 — New Caledonia
 B. calligaster Simon, 1884 (type) — New Caledonia
 B. crispatus Simon, 1884 — New Caledonia
 B. panie Platnick & Forster, 1993 — New Caledonia
 B. tandji Platnick & Forster, 1993 — New Caledonia

C

Caledomedes

Caledomedes Raven & Hebron, 2018
 C. flavovittatus (Simon, 1880) (type) — New Caledonia

Caripetella

Caripetella Strand, 1928
 C. madagascariensis (Lenz, 1886) (type) — Madagascar, Comoros

Charminus

Charminus Thorell, 1899
 C. aethiopicus (Caporiacco, 1939) — Ethiopia, Kenya
 C. ambiguus (Lessert, 1925) — East, Southern Africa
 C. a. concolor (Caporiacco, 1947) — East Africa
 C. atomarius (Lawrence, 1942) — Central, East, Southern Africa
 C. bifidus Blandin, 1978 — Rwanda
 C. camerunensis Thorell, 1899 (type) — West, Central Africa
 C. marfieldi (Roewer, 1955) — West, Central Africa
 C. minor (Lessert, 1928) — Ivory Coast, Congo
 C. natalensis (Lawrence, 1947) — South Africa
 C. rotundus Blandin, 1978 — Congo

Chiasmopes

Chiasmopes Pavesi, 1883
 C. hystrix (Berland, 1922) — Ethiopia
 C. lineatus (Pocock, 1898) — Central, East, Southern Africa
 C. namaquensis (Roewer, 1955) — Namibia
 C. signatus (Pocock, 1902) — South Africa

Cispinilus

Cispinilus Roewer, 1955
 C. flavidus (Simon, 1909) (type) — Central Africa

Cispius

Cispius Simon, 1898
 C. affinis Lessert, 1916 — East Africa
 C. bidentatus Lessert, 1936 — Central, East Africa
 C. kimbius Blandin, 1978 — South Africa
 C. maruanus (Roewer, 1955) — West, Central Africa
 C. problematicus Blandin, 1978 — Congo
 C. simoni Lessert, 1915 — East Africa
 C. strandi Caporiacco, 1947 — East Africa
 C. thorelli Blandin, 1978 — Congo
 C. variegatus Simon, 1898 (type) — Congo

Cladycnis

Cladycnis Simon, 1898
 C. insignis (Lucas, 1838) (type) — Canary Is.

Conakrya

Conakrya Schmidt, 1956
 C. wolffi Schmidt, 1956 (type) — Guinea

D

Dendrolycosa

Dendrolycosa Doleschall, 1859
 D. bairdi Jäger, 2011 — Laos
 D. bobbiliensis (Reddy & Patel, 1993) — India
 D. cruciata (Roewer, 1955) — Tanzania
 D. duckitti Jäger, 2011 — Laos, Indonesia (Sumatra)
 D. fusca Doleschall, 1859 (type) — Indonesia (Ambon)
 D. gitae (Tikader, 1970) — India (mainland, Andaman Is.)
 D. icadia (L. Koch, 1876) — Australia (Queensland)
 D. kakadu Raven & Hebron, 2018 — Australia (Northern Territory)
 D. lepida (Thorell, 1890) — Indonesia (Sumatra)
 D. ornata (Berland, 1924) — New Caledonia
 D. parangbusta (Barrion & Litsinger, 1995) — Philippines
 D. putiana (Barrion & Litsinger, 1995) — Philippines
 D. robusta (Thorell, 1895) — China, Myanmar, Laos, Vietnam
 D. rossi Silva & Griswold, 2013 — Madagascar
 D. sierwaldae Jäger, 2011 — New Guinea
 D. songi (Zhang, 2000) — China
 D. yuka Jäger, 2011 — South Africa

Dolomedes

Dolomedes Latreille, 1804
 D. actaeon Pocock, 1903 — Cameroon
 D. albicomus L. Koch, 1867 — Australia (Queensland, New South Wales)
 D. albicoxus Bertkau, 1880 — Brazil
 D. albineus Hentz, 1845 — USA
 D. alexandri Raven & Hebron, 2018 — Australia (Capital Territory, Victoria)
 D. angolensis (Roewer, 1955) — Angola
 D. angustivirgatus Kishida, 1936 — China, Korea, Japan
 D. angustus (Thorell, 1899) — Cameroon
 D. annulatus Simon, 1877 — Philippines
 D. aquaticus Goyen, 1888 — New Zealand
 D. batesi Pocock, 1903 — Cameroon
 D. bistylus Roewer, 1955 — Congo
 D. boiei (Doleschall, 1859) — Sri Lanka, Indonesia (Java)
 D. briangreenei Raven & Hebron, 2018 — Australia (New South Wales, Queensland)
 D. bukhkaloi Marusik, 1988 — Russia
 D. chevronus Yin, 2012 — China
 D. chinesus Chamberlin, 1924 — China
 D. chroesus Strand, 1911 — Indonesia (Aru Is., New Guinea)
 D. costatus Zhang, Zhu & Song, 2004 — China
 D. crosbyi Lessert, 1928 — Congo
 D. dondalei Vink & Dupérré, 2010 — New Zealand
 D. elegans Taczanowski, 1874 — French Guiana
 D. facetus L. Koch, 1876 — Australia, Indonesia (New Guinea), Samoa, New Hebrides?
 D. fageli Roewer, 1955 — Congo
 D. femoralis Hasselt, 1882 — Indonesia (Sumatra)
 D. fernandensis Simon, 1909 — Equatorial Guinea (Bioko)
 D. fimbriatus (Clerck, 1757) (type) — Europe, Caucasus, Russia (Europe to Far East), Central Asia, Japan
 D. flaminius L. Koch, 1867 — Australia (Queensland)?, New Caledonia?
 D. fontus Tanikawa & Miyashita, 2008 — Japan
 D. furcatus Roewer, 1955 — Mozambique
 D. fuscipes Roewer, 1955 — Cameroon
 D. fuscus Franganillo, 1931 — Cuba
 D. gertschi Carico, 1973 — USA
 D. gracilipes Lessert, 1928 — Congo
 D. guamuhaya Alayón, 2003 — Cuba
 D. holti Carico, 1973 — Mexico
 D. horishanus Kishida, 1936 — Taiwan, Japan
 D. hyppomene Audouin, 1826 — Egypt
 D. instabilis L. Koch, 1876 — Australia, Papua New Guinea
 D. intermedius Giebel, 1863 — Colombia
 D. japonicus Bösenberg & Strand, 1906 — China, Korea, Japan
 D. kalanoro Silva & Griswold, 2013 — Madagascar
 D. karijini Raven & Hebron, 2018 — Australia (Western Australia)
 D. karschi Strand, 1913 — Sri Lanka
 D. lafoensis Berland, 1924 — New Caledonia
 D. laticeps Pocock, 1898 — Solomon Is.
 D. lesserti Roewer, 1955 — Mozambique
 D. lizturnerae Raven & Hebron, 2018 — Australia (Tasmania)
 D. machadoi Roewer, 1955 — West Africa
 D. macrops Simon, 1906 — Sudan
 D. mankorlod Raven & Hebron, 2018 — Australia (Northern Territory)
 D. mendigoetmopasi Barrion, 1995 — Philippines
 D. minahassae Merian, 1911 — Indonesia (Sulawesi)
 D. m. vulcanicus Merian, 1911 — Indonesia (Sulawesi)
 D. minor L. Koch, 1876 — New Zealand
 D. mizhoanus Kishida, 1936 — China, Laos, Malaysia, Taiwan
 D. naja Berland, 1938 — Vanuatu
 D. neocaledonicus Berland, 1924 — New Caledonia
 D. nigrimaculatus Song & Chen, 1991 — China, Korea
 D. noukhaiva Walckenaer, 1847 — Marquesas Is.
 D. ohsuditia Kishida, 1936 — Japan
 D. okefinokensis Bishop, 1924 — USA
 D. orion Tanikawa, 2003 — Japan
 D. palmatus Zhang, Zhu & Song, 2005 — China
 D. palpiger Pocock, 1903 — Cameroon
 D. paroculus Simon, 1901 — Malaysia
 D. pedder Raven & Hebron, 2018 — Australia (Tasmania)
 D. pegasus Tanikawa, 2012 — Japan
 D. petalinus Yin, 2012 — China
 D. plantarius (Clerck, 1757) — Europe, Russia (Europe to South Siberia), Kazakhstan
 D. pullatus Nicolet, 1849 — Chile
 D. raptor Bösenberg & Strand, 1906 — Russia, China, Korea, Japan
 D. raptoroides Zhang, Zhu & Song, 2004 — China
 D. saganus Bösenberg & Strand, 1906 — China, Taiwan, Japan
 D. schauinslandi Simon, 1899 — New Zealand
 D. scriptus Hentz, 1845 — USA, Canada
 D. senilis Simon, 1880 — Russia, China, Japan
 D. signatus Walckenaer, 1837 — Mariana Is.
 D. silvicola Tanikawa & Miyashita, 2008 — China, Japan
 D. smithi Lessert, 1916 — East Africa
 D. spathularis Hasselt, 1882 — Indonesia (Sumatra)
 D. straeleni Roewer, 1955 — Congo
 D. striatus Giebel, 1869 — USA, Canada
 D. sulfureus L. Koch, 1878 — Russia, China, Korea, Japan
 D. sumatranus Strand, 1906 — Indonesia (Sumatra)
 D. tadzhikistanicus Andreeva, 1976 — Tajikistan
 D. tenebrosus Hentz, 1844 — USA, Canada
 D. titan Berland, 1924 — New Caledonia, Vanuatu
 D. toldo Alayón, 2003 — Cuba
 D. transfuga Pocock, 1900 — Congo
 D. triton (Walckenaer, 1837) — North America, Cuba
 D. upembensis (Roewer, 1955) — Congo
 D. vatovae Caporiacco, 1940 — Ethiopia
 D. venmani Raven & Hebron, 2018 — Australia (New South Wales, Queensland)
 D. vicque Raven & Hebron, 2018 — Australia (Victoria, New South Wales, Queensland)
 D. vittatus Walckenaer, 1837 — USA
 D. wetarius Strand, 1911 — Indonesia
 D. wollastoni Hogg, 1915 — New Guinea
 D. wollemi Raven & Hebron, 2018 — Australia (New South Wales)
 D. yawatai Ono, 2002 — Japan (Ryukyu Is.)
 D. zatsun Tanikawa, 2003 — Japan
 D. zhangjiajiensis Yin, 2012 — China

E

Eucamptopus

Eucamptopus Pocock, 1900
 E. coronatus Pocock, 1900 (type) — India

Euprosthenops

Euprosthenops Pocock, 1897
 E. australis Simon, 1898 — Senegal, Nigeria, Zambia, Botswana, South Africa
 E. bayaonianus (Brito Capello, 1867) (type) — West, Central, East Africa
 E. benoiti Blandin, 1976 — Rwanda
 E. biguttatus Roewer, 1955 — Congo, Namibia
 E. ellioti (O. Pickard-Cambridge, 1877) — India
 E. pavesii Lessert, 1928 — Central, East Africa
 E. proximus Lessert, 1916 — Central, East, Southern Africa
 E. p. maximus Blandin, 1976 — Ivory Coast
 E. schenkeli (Roewer, 1955) — East Africa
 E. wuehlischi Roewer, 1955 — Namibia

Euprosthenopsis

Euprosthenopsis Blandin, 1974
 E. armata (Strand, 1913) (type) — Central, East Africa
 E. lamorali Blandin, 1977 — South Africa
 E. lesserti (Roewer, 1955) — East Africa
 E. l. garambensis (Lessert, 1928) — Central Africa
 E. pulchella (Pocock, 1902) — South Africa, Lesotho, Eswatini
 E. rothschildi Blandin, 1977 — Kenya
 E. vachoni Blandin, 1977 — Djibouti
 E. vuattouxi Blandin, 1977 — Ivory Coast

H

Hala

Hala Jocqué, 1994
 H. impigra Jocqué, 1994 (type) — Madagascar
 H. paulyi Jocqué, 1994 — Madagascar

Hygropoda

Hygropoda Thorell, 1894
 H. africana Simon, 1898 — Gabon, Sierra Leone
 H. albolimbata (Thorell, 1878) — Indonesia (Ambon)
 H. argentata Zhang, Zhu & Song, 2004 — China, Thailand
 H. balingkinitanus (Barrion & Litsinger, 1995) — Philippines
 H. borbonica (Vinson, 1863) — Réunion
 H. bottrelli (Barrion & Litsinger, 1995) — Philippines
 H. campanulata Zhang, Zhu & Song, 2004 — China, Thailand
 H. celebesiana (Strand, 1913) — Indonesia (Sulawesi)
 H. chandrakantii (Reddy & Patel, 1993) — India
 H. dolomedes (Doleschall, 1859) — Indonesia (Ambon)
 H. gracilis (Thorell, 1891) — India (Nicobar Is.)
 H. higenaga (Kishida, 1936) — China, Taiwan, Japan
 H. linearis (Simon, 1903) — Madagascar
 H. lineata (Thorell, 1881) — Indonesia to Australia
 H. longimana (Stoliczka, 1869) — Bangladesh, Malaysia
 H. longitarsis (Thorell, 1877) — Vietnam, Indonesia (Sulawesi)
 H. l. fasciata (Thorell, 1877) — Indonesia (Sulawesi)
 H. macropus Pocock, 1897 — Indonesia (Moluccas)
 H. menglun Zhang, Zhu & Song, 2004 — China
 H. procera Thorell, 1895 — Myanmar
 H. prognatha Thorell, 1894 (type) — Singapore
 H. sikkimus (Tikader, 1970) — India (mainland, Andaman Is.)
 H. subannulipes Strand, 1911 — Indonesia (Aru Is.)
 H. taeniata Wang, 1993 — China
 H. tangana (Roewer, 1955) — Tanzania, Kenya, South Africa, Madagascar
 H. yunnan Zhang, Zhu & Song, 2004 — China, Thailand, Laos

I

Ilipula

Ilipula Simon, 1903
 I. anguicula Simon, 1903 (type) — Vietnam

Inola

Inola Davies, 1982
 I. amicabilis Davies, 1982 (type) — Australia (Queensland)
 I. cracentis Davies, 1982 — Australia (Queensland)
 I. daviesae Tio & Humphrey, 2010 — Australia (Queensland)
 I. subtilis Davies, 1982 — Australia (Queensland)

M

Mangromedes

Mangromedes Raven, 2018
 M. kochi (Roewer, 1951) (type) — Australia (Queensland)
 M. porosus Raven & Hebron, 2018 — Australia (Northern Territory)

Maypacius

Maypacius Simon, 1898
 M. bilineatus (Pavesi, 1895) (type) — Central, East Africa, Madagascar
 M. christophei Blandin, 1975 — Congo
 M. curiosus Blandin, 1975 — Congo
 M. gilloni Blandin, 1978 — Senegal
 M. kaestneri Roewer, 1955 — West, Central Africa
 M. petrunkevitchi Lessert, 1933 — Angola, Rwanda
 M. roeweri Blandin, 1975 — Congo
 M. stuhlmanni (Bösenberg & Lenz, 1895) — Tanzania (mainland, Zanzibar)
 M. vittiger Simon, 1898 — Madagascar

Megadolomedes

Megadolomedes Davies & Raven, 1980
 M. australianus (L. Koch, 1865) (type) — Australia (New South Wales)
 M. johndouglasi Raven & Hebron, 2018 — Australia (Tasmania, Victoria)
 M. nord Raven & Hebron, 2018 — Australia (Queensland)
 M. trux (Lamb, 1911) — Australia (New South Wales, Queensland)

N

Nilus

Nilus O. Pickard-Cambridge, 1876
 N. albocinctus (Doleschall, 1859) — India to Philippines
 N. curtus O. Pickard-Cambridge, 1876 (type) — Africa
 N. decorata (Patel & Reddy, 1990) — India
 N. esimoni (Sierwald, 1984) — Madagascar
 N. jayakari (F. O. Pickard-Cambridge, 1898) — Oman
 N. kolosvaryi (Caporiacco, 1947) — Central, East, Southern Africa
 N. leoninus (Strand, 1916) — Madagascar
 N. majungensis (Strand, 1907) — Mayotte, Madagascar
 N. margaritatus (Pocock, 1898) — Central, South Africa
 N. massajae (Pavesi, 1883) — Africa
 N. paralbocinctus (Zhang, Zhu & Song, 2004) — China, Laos
 N. phipsoni (F. O. Pickard-Cambridge, 1898) — India to China, Indonesia
 N. pictus (Simon, 1898) — West, Central Africa
 N. pseudoalbocinctus (Sen, Saha & Raychaudhuri, 2010) — India
 N. pseudojuvenilis (Sierwald, 1987) — Mozambique
 N. radiatolineatus (Strand, 1906) — Africa
 N. rossi (Pocock, 1902) — Central, South Africa
 N. rubromaculatus (Thorell, 1899) — West, Central Africa

O

Ornodolomedes

Ornodolomedes Raven & Hebron, 2018
 O. benrevelli Raven & Hebron, 2018 (type) — Australia (Queensland)
 O. gorenpul Raven & Hebron, 2018 — Australia (Queensland)
 O. marshi Raven & Hebron, 2018 — Australia (Queensland)
 O. mickfanningi Raven & Hebron, 2018 — Australia (Queensland)
 O. nebulosus Raven & Hebron, 2018 — Australia (Queensland)
 O. nicholsoni Raven & Hebron, 2018 — Australia (Western Australia)
 O. southcotti Raven & Hebron, 2018 — Australia (South Australia)
 O. staricki Raven & Hebron, 2018 — Australia (Victoria)
 O. xypee Raven & Hebron, 2018 — Australia (Queensland)
 O. yalangi Raven & Hebron, 2018 — Australia (Queensland)

P

Papakula

Papakula Strand, 1911
 P. niveopunctata Strand, 1911 (type) — Indonesia (Aru Is.)

Paracladycnis

Paracladycnis Blandin, 1979
 P. vis Blandin, 1979 (type) — Madagascar

Perenethis

Perenethis L. Koch, 1878
 P. dentifasciata (O. Pickard-Cambridge, 1885) — Pakistan or India
 P. fascigera (Bösenberg & Strand, 1906) — China, Korea, Japan
 P. simoni (Lessert, 1916) — Africa, Comoros
 P. sindica (Simon, 1897) — India, Sri Lanka, Nepal, China, Philippines
 P. symmetrica (Lawrence, 1927) — Africa
 P. venusta L. Koch, 1878 (type) — India, Myanmar, Thailand, Singapore, Philippines, Japan, Papua New Guinea, Australia (Queensland, Western Australia)

Phalaeops

Phalaeops Roewer, 1955
 P. mossambicus Roewer, 1955 (type) — Mozambique
 P. somalicus Roewer, 1955 — Djibouti

Pisaura

Pisaura Simon, 1886
 P. acoreensis Wunderlich, 1992 — Azores
 P. anahitiformis Kishida, 1910 — Japan
 P. ancora Paik, 1969 — Russia, China, Korea
 P. bicornis Zhang & Song, 1992 — China, Japan
 P. consocia (O. Pickard-Cambridge, 1872) — Cyprus, Turkey, Israel, Lebanon, Syria
 P. lama Bösenberg & Strand, 1906 — Russia, China, Korea, Japan
 P. mirabilis (Clerck, 1757) (type) — Europe, Turkey, Middle East, Caucasus, Russia (Europe to Middle Siberia), Central Asia, China
 P. novicia (L. Koch, 1878) — Mediterranean to Central Asia
 P. orientalis Kulczyński, 1913 — Mediterranean
 P. podilensis Patel & Reddy, 1990 — India
 P. quadrilineata (Lucas, 1838) — Canary Is., Madeira
 P. sublama Zhang, 2000 — China
 P. swamii Patel, 1987 — India

Pisaurina

Pisaurina Simon, 1898
 P. brevipes (Emerton, 1911) — USA, Canada
 P. dubia (Hentz, 1847) — USA
 P. mira (Walckenaer, 1837) (type) — USA, Canada
 P. undulata (Keyserling, 1887) — USA, Cuba

Polyboea

Polyboea Thorell, 1895
 P. vulpina Thorell, 1895 (type) — India, Myanmar, Thailand, Malaysia, Singapore
 P. zonaformis (Wang, 1993) — India, China, Laos

Q

Qianlingula

Qianlingula Zhang, Zhu & Song, 2004
 Q. bilamellata Zhang, Zhu & Song, 2004 (type) — China
 Q. jiafu Zhang, Zhu & Song, 2004 — China
 Q. turbinata Zhang, Zhu & Song, 2004 — China

R

Rothus

Rothus Simon, 1898
 R. aethiopicus (Pavesi, 1883) — Africa, Israel
 R. auratus Pocock, 1900 — South Africa
 R. vittatus Simon, 1898 — South Africa

S

Sphedanus

Sphedanus Thorell, 1877
 S. banna (Zhang, Zhu & Song, 2004) — China, Laos
 S. quadrimaculatus (Thorell, 1897) — Singapore, Malaysia, Indonesia (Borneo)
 S. undatus Thorell, 1877 (type) — Indonesia (Sulawesi)

Stoliczka

Stoliczka O. Pickard-Cambridge, 1885
 S. affinis Caporiacco, 1935 — Pakistan
 S. insignis O. Pickard-Cambridge, 1885 (type) — Pakistan

T

Tallonia

Tallonia Simon, 1889
 T. picta Simon, 1889 (type) — Madagascar

Tapinothele

Tapinothele Simon, 1898
 T. astuta Simon, 1898 (type) — Tanzania (Zanzibar)

Tapinothelella

Tapinothelella Strand, 1909
 T. laboriosa Strand, 1909 (type) — South Africa

Tapinothelops

Tapinothelops Roewer, 1955
 T. concolor (Caporiacco, 1947) (type) — East Africa
 T. vittipes (Caporiacco, 1941) — Ethiopia

Tasmomedes

Tasmomedes Raven, 2018
 T. eberhardarum (Strand, 1913) (type) — Australia (Victoria, Tasmania)

Tetragonophthalma

Tetragonophthalma Karsch, 1878
 T. vulpina (Simon, 1898) — West, Central Africa

Thalassiopsis

Thalassiopsis Roewer, 1955
 T. vachoni Roewer, 1955 (type) — Madagascar

Thaumasia

Thaumasia Perty, 1833
 T. abrahami Mello-Leitão, 1948 — Honduras to Brazil
 T. acreana Silva & Carico, 2012 — Brazil
 T. annulipes F. O. Pickard-Cambridge, 1903 — Suriname, Peru, Brazil
 T. argenteonotata (Simon, 1898) — Mexico to Brazil
 T. caracarai Silva & Carico, 2012 — Mexico to Brazil
 T. caxiuana Silva & Carico, 2012 — Brazil
 T. diasi Silva & Carico, 2012 — Ecuador, Brazil
 T. heterogyna Chamberlin & Ivie, 1936 — Panama to Brazil
 T. hirsutochela Silva & Carico, 2012 — Costa Rica to Brazil
 T. lisei Silva & Carico, 2012 — Brazil
 T. onca Silva & Carico, 2012 — Colombia to Brazil
 T. oriximina Silva & Carico, 2012 — Brazil
 T. peruana Silva & Carico, 2012 — Peru
 T. scoparia (Simon, 1888) — Venezuela
 T. senilis Perty, 1833 (type) — Costa Rica to Paraguay
 T. velox Simon, 1898 — Panama to Argentina
 T. xingu Silva & Carico, 2012 — Colombia to Brazil

Tinus

Tinus F. O. Pickard-Cambridge, 1901
 T. arindamai Biswas & Roy, 2005 — India
 T. connexus (Bryant, 1940) — Cuba, Hispaniola
 T. minutus F. O. Pickard-Cambridge, 1901 — Mexico to El Salvador
 T. nigrinus F. O. Pickard-Cambridge, 1901 (type) — Mexico to Costa Rica
 T. oaxaca Carico, 2008 — Mexico
 T. palictlus Carico, 1976 — Mexico
 T. peregrinus (Bishop, 1924) — USA, Mexico
 T. prusius Carico, 1976 — Mexico
 T. schlingeri Silva, 2012 — Mexico
 T. tibialis F. O. Pickard-Cambridge, 1901 — Mexico
 T. ursus Carico, 1976 — Costa Rica, Panama

Tolma

Tolma Jocqué, 1994
 T. toreuta Jocqué, 1994 (type) — Madagascar

V

Voraptipus

Voraptipus Roewer, 1955
 V. agilis Roewer, 1955 (type) — Mozambique

Vuattouxia

Vuattouxia Blandin, 1979
 V. kouassikonani Blandin, 1979 (type) — Ivory Coast

W

Walrencea

Walrencea Blandin, 1979
 W. globosa Blandin, 1979 (type) — South Africa

References

Pisauridae